The Body ("Un corpo") is a short story by Camillo Boito. It is a psychological study of two obsessive men, an artist and an anatomist who lust after the beauty of Charlotte, the former's mistress. Eventually, their self-destructive obsession borders on necrophilia.

Although nowhere near as famous as Boito's other story, "Senso", "The Body" is considered to be one of the author's best works and was adapted into an opera of the same title by the Greek composer Kharálampos Goyós, commissioned and premiered by the Experimental Stage of the Greek National Opera in 2008.

References

Italian short stories